Senator Payne may refer to:

Members of the United States Senate
Frederick G. Payne (1904–1978), U.S. Senator from Maine from 1953 to 1959
Henry B. Payne (1810–1896), U.S. Senator from Ohio from 1885 to 1891

United States state senate members
Chuck Payne (born 1964), Georgia State Senate
Elisha Payne (1731–1807), New Hampshire State Senate
Franklin Payne (died 1994), Missouri State Senate
Harry Vearle Payne (1908–1984), New Mexico State Senate
Lewis S. Payne (1819–1898), New York State Senate
William Payne (New Mexico politician) (born 1951), New Mexico State Senate

See also
Senator Paine (disambiguation)